Olcnava is a village and municipality in the Spišská Nová Ves District in the Košice Region of central-eastern Slovakia.

History
In historical records the village was first mentioned in 1312.

Geography
The village lies at an altitude of 404 metres and covers an area of 15.211 km².
In 2011 had a population of exactly 1000 inhabitants.

External links
http://www.statistics.sk/mosmis/eng/run.html
http://www.olcnava.sk

References

Villages and municipalities in Spišská Nová Ves District